Maalaiskunta (Finnish), landskommun (Swedish), "rural municipality", abbreviated mlk was one of the four types of municipality in Finland in 1865–1976. Other types in 1865–1959 were city (in Finnish kaupunki) and market town (in Finnish kauppala), in 1960–1976 old city (in Finnish vanha kaupunki), new city (in Finnish uusi kaupunki) and market town. Maalaiskunta was the most common type of municipality. In the 1977 reform, all municipalities were given fully equal legal standing. Previous maalaiskuntas associated with a city retained their name. For example, Rovaniemen maalaiskunta ("the rural municipality of Rovaniemi) surrounded the city of Rovaniemi, but were independently governed. From 2009, no municipalities will carry this name any more, after the merger of Jyväskylä and Jyväskylän mlk.

Rural municipalities were legally independent from the cities carrying the same name. However, in some cases, particularly when the city was in the geographic center of the municipality, rural municipalities have placed their offices in the city, on the territory of a different municipality. Rural municipalities have also changed their names to create an identity distinct from the city. For example, Vantaa was previously known as Helsingin maalaiskunta, as it was the historical center of Helsinki (location of the Helsinki church village).

In addition, in 1926 Lohja was split into Lohjan maalaiskunta, which was known as Lohjan kunta after 1977, and Lohjan kauppala (later Lohjan kaupunki), but the two merged again in 1997.

List of municipalities explicitly named maalaiskunta
  Ekenäs landskommun (in Finnish Tammisaaren maalaiskunta)
 attached  in 1977 with Snappertuna as Ekenäs town
  Heinolan maalaiskunta
 attached to Heinola in 1997
  Helsingin maalaiskunta (the Swedish name was Helsinge without the word landskommun)
 got the rights of market town in  1972 name changed to Vantaa
  Hyvinkään maalaiskunta
 attached in 1969 to Hyvinkää
 Hämeenlinnan maalaiskunta
 attached in 1948 to Hämeenlinna, Vanaja and Renko
  Iisalmen maalaiskunta
 attached in  1970 to Iisalmi
  Ikaalisten maalaiskunta
 united in  1972 with Ikaalinen
  Jyväskylän maalaiskunta
 last municipality with the word maalaiskunta attached in 2009 to Jyväskylä
  Kajaanin maalaiskunta
 attached in 1977 to Kajaani
  Karis landskommun (in Finnish Karjaan maalaiskunta)
 attached in  1969 to Karis
  Kemijärven maalaiskunta
 united in 1973 with Kemijärvi market town and formed as Kemijärvi town
  Kemin maalaiskunta
 name changed to Keminmaa in 1980
  Koiviston maalaiskunta
 territorial loss to Soviet Union in 1944
  Kokkolan maalaiskunta
 changed name to Kaarlela in 1927, attached to Kokkola in 1977.
  Kristinestads landskommun (in Finnish Kristiinankaupungin maalaiskunta)
 changed name to Tjöck in 1919, attached to Kristinestad in 1973.
  Kuopion maalaiskunta
 attached in 1969 to Kuopio and Siilinjärvi
 Käkisalmen maalaiskunta
 territorial loss to Soviet Union in 1944
  Lohjan maalaiskunta (in Swedish Lojo landskommun)
 name changed to Lohjan kunta ("municipality of Lohja") in 1977, attached to the city of Lohja in 1997.
  Loimaan maalaiskunta
 name changed Loimaan kunta ("municipality of Loimaa") in 1977, attached to the city of Loimaa in 2005
  Mikkelin maalaiskunta
 attached  in 2001 to Mikkeli
  Naantalin maalaiskunta
 attached  in 1964 to Naantali
  Nurmeksen maalaiskunta
 attached  in 1973 to Nurmes  market town
  Nykarleby landskommun (in Finnish Uudenkaarlepyyn maalaiskunta)
 attached  in 1975 with Munsala and Jeppo as Nykarleby town
  Oulun maalaiskunta
 name changed as Oulujoki in 1910, and annexed in 1965 with Haukipudas, Kempele, Kiiminki, Oulu, Oulunsalo, Tyrnävä, Utajärvi and Ylikiiminki
  Pargas landskommun (in Finnish Paraisten maalaiskunta)
 attached  in 1967 to  Pargas market town
  Pieksämäen maalaiskunta
 united in 2004 with Jäppilä and Virtasalmi as Pieksänmaa, which merged with Pieksämäki in 2007
  Pedersöre (in Finnish former Pietarsaaren maalaiskunta)
 the Finnish name changed as Pedersören kunta in 1989, the Swedish name was always Pedersöre without the word landskommun
  Porin maalaiskunta
 attached  in 1967 to  Pori
  Porvoon maalaiskunta (in Swedish Borgå landskommun)
 attached   in 1997 to Porvoo
  Rauman maalaiskunta
 attached  in 1993 to Rauma
  Rovaniemen maalaiskunta
 attached  in 2006 to Rovaniemi
  Seinäjoen maalaiskunta
 attached in 1959 to Seinäjoki market town
 Sortavalan maalaiskunta
 territorial loss in 1944 to Soviet Union
 Uudenkaupungin maalaiskunta
 attached  in 1969 to Uusikaupunki
 Viipurin maalaiskunta
 territorial loss in 1944 to Soviet Union
  Äänekosken maalaiskunta
 attached in 1969 to Äänekoski market town.

Subdivisions of Finland
Former subdivisions of Finland